This is a list of the Armenian Catholic catholicos patriarchs of Cilicia, officially the Catholicos Patriarch of Cilicia of Armenian Catholics. The Armenian Catholic Patriarchate of Cilicia was established in 1740 following a schism within the Armenian Patriarchate based in Cilicia and was recognized by the Pope on 26 November 1742. The Catholicos-Patriarch is the head of the Armenian Catholic Church, one of the Eastern Catholic Churches in full communion with the Holy See and therefore part of the broader Catholic Church.

Armenian Catholic catholicos patriarchs of Cilicia
(in parentheses in Armenian language using classical Armenian spelling)

Abraham Petros I Ardzivian (1740–1749) (Աբրահամ Պետրոս Ա. Արծիւեան)
Hagop Petros II Hovsepian (1749–1753) (Յակոբ Պետրոս Բ. Յովսէփեան)
Michael Petros III Kasparian (1753–1780) (Միքայէլ Պետրոս Գ. Գասպարեան)
Parsegh Petros IV Avkadian (1780–1788) (Բարսեղ Պետրոս Դ. Աւգատեան)
 (1788–1812) (Գրիգոր Պետրոս Ե. Քիւբելեան)
 (1815–1841) (Գրիգոր Պետրոս Զ. Ճերանեան)
 (1841–1843) (Յակոբ Պետրոս Է. Հոլասեան)
 (1844–1866) (Գրիգոր Պետրոս Ը. Տէր Աստուածատուրեան)
Anthony Petros IX Hassun (1866–1881) (ԱՆտոն Պետրոս Թ. Հասունեան)
Jacob Pahtiarian (anti-patriarch) c. (1871–) (Յակոբ հակաթոռ)
 (1881–1899) (Ստեփանոս Պետրոս Ժ. Ազարեան)
 (1899–1904) (Պօղոս Պետրոս ԺԱ Էմմանուէլեան)
 (1904–1910) (Պօղոս Պետրոս ԺԲ. Սապպաղեան)
 (1910–1931) (Պօղոս Պետրոս ԺԳ. Թերզեան)
 (1931–1937) (Աւետիս Պետրոս ԺԴ. Արփիարեան)
Gregory Petros XV Agagianian (1937–1962) (Գրիգոր Պետրոս ԺԵ. Աղաճանեան)
Ignatius Petros XVI Batanian (1962–1976) (Իգնատիոս Պետրոս ԺԶ Պաթանեան)
Hemaiag Petros XVII Ghedighian (1976–1982) (Հմայեակ Պետրոս ԺԷ. Կետիկեան)
John Petros XVIII Kasparian (1982–1999) (Յովաննէս Պետրոս ԺԸ. Գասպարեան)
Nerses Petros XIX Tarmouni (1999–2015) (Ներսէս Պետրոս ԺԹ. Թարմունի) 
Krikor Petros XX Gabroyan (2015–2021) (Գրիգոր Պետրոս Ի. Կապրոյեան)
Raphaël Bedros XXI Minassian (since 2021) (Ռաֆայել Պետրոս ԻԱ. Մինասյան)

See also
List of Armenian catholicoi of Cilicia
List of Catholicoi of Armenia
Armenian Patriarchs of Constantinople
Armenian Patriarchs of Jerusalem

References

External links
Official website

Arm
 
Cil
Catholic Patriarchs Of Cilicia

Lists of patriarchs
Aremenian Catholic of Cilicia